Events in the year 2022 in Sierra Leone.

Incumbents 

 President of Sierra Leone: Julius Maada Bio
 Chief Minister of Sierra Leone: David J. Francis

Events 

COVID-19 pandemic in Sierra Leone
2022 Sierra Leone protests

Sports 

 Sierra Leone at the 2021 Islamic Solidarity Games
 Sierra Leone at the 2022 Commonwealth Games
 Sierra Leone at the 2022 World Athletics Championships

 
2020s in Sierra Leone
Years of the 21st century in Sierra Leone
Sierra Leone
Sierra Leone